Arthur Aston may refer to:
 Sir Arthur Aston (governor) (died 1627),  proprietary governor of Avalon
 Sir Arthur Aston (army officer) (1590–1649),  English soldier and Royalist
 Sir Arthur Ingram Aston (1798–1836), English diplomat
 Arthur Vincent Aston (1886–1981), colonial administrator in British Malaya